Furaneol, or strawberry furanone, is an organic compound used in the flavor and perfume industry. It is formally a derivative of furan.  It is a white or colorless solid that is soluble in water and organic solvents.

Odor and occurrence
Although malodorous at high concentrations, it exhibits a sweet strawberry aroma when dilute.  It is found in strawberries and a variety of other fruits and it is partly responsible for the smell of fresh pineapple.
It is also an important component of the odours of buckwheat, and tomato.

Stereoisomerism
Furaneol has two enantiomers, (R)-(+)-furaneol and (S)-(−)-furaneol.  The (R)-form is mainly responsible for the smell.

Biosynthesis
It is one of several products from the dehydration of glucose. Its immediate biosynthetic precursor is the glucoside, derived from dehydration of sucrose.

References

Flavors
Enones
Enols
Dihydrofurans
Sweet-smelling chemicals